Dreaming My Dreams or Dreamin' My Dreams may refer to:

 Dreamin' My Dreams (Marianne Faithfull album), 1976
or the title song
 Dreamin' My Dreams (Patty Loveless album), 2005
or the cover of the song "Dreaming My Dreams with You" by Allen Reynolds
 Dreaming My Dreams (Waylon Jennings album), 1975
or the song "Dreaming My Dreams with You" written for Jennings
 "Dreaming My Dreams" (The Cranberries song), 1995